Vermio is a former municipality in Kozani regional unit, West Macedonia, Greece. Since the 2011 local government reform, it is part of the municipality Eordaia, of which it is a municipal unit. The municipal unit has an area of 187.153 km2. In 2011, it had a total population of 2,768 permanent inhabitants. The seat of the municipality was in Komnina.

References

Municipality of Vermio

Populated places in Kozani (regional unit)
Former municipalities in Western Macedonia

bg:Каракамен (дем)